Mariana Sahakian (born September 2, 1977) is a Lebanese table tennis player. She competed at the 2016 Summer Olympics in the women's singles event, in which she was eliminated in the preliminary round by Nigerian Olufunke Oshonaike.

References

1977 births
Living people
Lebanese female table tennis players
Olympic table tennis players of Lebanon
Table tennis players at the 2016 Summer Olympics
Table tennis players at the 2006 Asian Games
Asian Games competitors for Lebanon